General elections were held in Japan on 20 November 1960. The result was a victory for the Liberal Democratic Party, which won 296 of the 467 seats. Voter turnout was 73.5%, the lowest since the 1947 general elections.

Background
The elections came near the end of a turbulent year marked by violent labour disputes at Mitsui Miike Coal Mine, the "May 19th Incident" in which Nobusuke Kishi and LDP lawmakers in the Diet forced the revised US-Japan Security Treaty through parliament (causing an upsurge in the Anpo protests), and the assassination of Japan Socialist Party (JSP) leader Inejirō Asanuma by wakizashi-wielding right-wing youth named Otoya Yamaguchi. Prior to the elections there were a number of left-wing street protests and right-wing vigilante actions.

Campaign
As public antipathy was largely towards Kishi and his cabinet, rather than flagship LDP policies, the election was not a setback for the party. Kishi's successor, Hayato Ikeda, was popular for his moderate attitude and public image as a practical finance minister, and LDP candidates focused heavily on issues such as maintaining already-strong economic growth. Ikeda made a splash with his promise to double the national income in ten years, known as the "Income Doubling Plan," which also promised economic benefits such as tax cuts to small businesses, farmers, and consumers.

The LDP also benefitted from factionalism in the JSP, as the more moderate and anti-communist Democratic Socialist Party seceded from the JSP at the beginning of the year, leading to a spoiler effect.

Results
Although the LDP saw a small reduction in its vote share compared to the 1958 elections and the JSP and DSP collectively received around 1.3 million more votes than the united JSP did in the 1958 elections, the LDP gained nine seats, while the JSP and DSP lost a net four seats.

By prefecture

References 

Japan
1960 elections in Japan
General elections in Japan
November 1960 events in Asia
Election and referendum articles with incomplete results